In Greek mythology, Thestor (Ancient Greek: Θέστωρ)  is a name that may refer to:

Thestor, son of Idmon and Laothoe, grandson of Apollo; some say that Idmon ("the knowing") was his own surname. By Polymela, he was the father of Calchas, Leucippe and Theonoe.
Thestor, a Trojan, who was killed by Ajax.
Thestor, another Trojan, brother of Satnius. They were sons of Enops and a Naiad nymph of the river Satnioeis. Thestor was slain by Patroclus, and Satnius by Ajax the Lesser.
Thestor, father of Alcmaon. His son fought at Troy and was killed with a spear by the Lycian leader Sarpedon .

See also 
  for Jovian asteroid 4035 Thestor

Notes

References 

 Gaius Julius Hyginus, Fabulae from The Myths of Hyginus translated and edited by Mary Grant. University of Kansas Publications in Humanistic Studies. Online version at the Topos Text Project.
 Homer, The Iliad with an English Translation by A.T. Murray, Ph.D. in two volumes. Cambridge, MA., Harvard University Press; London, William Heinemann, Ltd. 1924. . Online version at the Perseus Digital Library.
Homer, Homeri Opera in five volumes. Oxford, Oxford University Press. 1920. . Greek text available at the Perseus Digital Library.
 Quintus Smyrnaeus, The Fall of Troy translated by Way. A. S. Loeb Classical Library Volume 19. London: William Heinemann, 1913. Online version at theoi.com
 Quintus Smyrnaeus, The Fall of Troy. Arthur S. Way. London: William Heinemann; New York: G.P. Putnam's Sons. 1913. Greek text available at the Perseus Digital Library.

Trojans
People of the Trojan War
Argive characters in Greek mythology